Göçek is a Turkish surname. Notable people with the surname include:

Fatma Müge Göçek (born 1950), Turkish sociologist and professor
Hüseyin Göçek (born 1976), Turkish football referee

Turkish-language surnames